Nicholas Barr FRSA is a British economist, currently serving as professor of public economics at the London School of Economics (LSE). He received his Ph.D. in economics as a Fulbright Scholar from the University of California, Berkeley and his MSc in economics from LSE. According to his LSE biography, he has worked for the World Bank, "from 1990 to 1992 working on the design of income transfers and health finance in Central and Eastern Europe and Russia, and in 1995–96 as a principal author of the World Bank's World Development Report 1996: From Plan to Market." He also served as an advisor to the British, Chinese and South African governments.

Since 1987, he has published four editions of his series, Economics of the welfare state, the last published in 2012, of which was published in 2004.

Publications
Investing in Human Capital: A Capital Markets Approach to Student Funding (2007), co-authored with Miguel Palacios Lleras
Labor Markets And Social Policy In Central And Eastern Europe: The Accession And Beyond (2005)
Economics of the welfare state (1987, 1993, 1998, 2004)
The Welfare State As Piggy Bank: Information, Risk, Uncertainty, and the Role of the State (2001)
Economic Theory and the Welfare State (2001)
Financing Higher Education: Answers from the UK (2001)
Labor Markets and Social Policy in Central and Eastern Europe: The Transition and Beyond (1994)
Poland: Income Support and the Social Safety Net During the Transition (World Bank Country Study) (1993)
The State of Welfare: The Welfare State in Britain Since 1974 (1990)
Strategies for Higher Education: The Alternative White Paper (Hume Papers) (1989)
Public Financing in Theory and Practice (1987)

See also
Public sector economics
Welfare economics

References

External links

British economists
Living people
UC Berkeley College of Letters and Science alumni
Alumni of the London School of Economics
Academics of the London School of Economics
Year of birth missing (living people)
Fulbright alumni